The 2006 WGC-Bridgestone Invitational was a golf tournament that was contested from August 24–27, 2006 over the South Course at Firestone Country Club in Akron, Ohio. It was the eighth WGC-Bridgestone Invitational tournament, and the second of four World Golf Championships events held in 2006.

World number 1 Tiger Woods won the tournament to retain the WGC-Bridgestone Invitational and claim his 11th World Golf Championships title, which was his fifth Invitational title. He won in a playoff over Stewart Cink, who also shot a 10-under-par 270.

Round summaries

First round

Second round

Third round

Final round

Scorecard

Cumulative tournament scores, relative to par

Source:

Sudden-death playoff

References

External links
Full results

WGC Invitational
WGC-Bridgestone Invitational
WGC-Bridgestone Invitational
WGC-Bridgestone Invitational